HMS A13 was an  submarine built for the Royal Navy in the first decade of the 20th century. She was the first British submarine not to use a petrol engine. After surviving World War I, she was sold for scrap in 1920.

Design and description

A13 was a member of the first British class of submarines, although slightly larger, faster and more heavily armed than the lead ship, . They displaced  on the surface and  submerged. The A-class submarines had a crew of 2 officers and 9 ratings.

For surface running, A13 was powered by a single vertical, six-cylinder  Hornsby-Akroyd oil engine that drove one propeller shaft. When submerged the propeller was driven by a  electric motor. They could reach  on the surface and  underwater. The heavy oil engine was  heavier than the petrol engines used by the other boats in the class and an equal amount of fuel had to be removed, which reduced their range despite the heavy oil engine's more economical consumption.

The boats were armed with two 18-inch (45 cm) torpedo tubes in the bow. They could carry a pair of reload torpedoes, but generally did not as doing so that they had to compensate for their weight by an equivalent weight of fuel.

Construction and career

A13 was ordered as part of the 1903–04 Naval Programme from at Vickers. She was laid down at the shipyard in Barrow-in-Furness in 1903, launched on 8 February 1905 and completed on 8 May 1905. The boat was broken up in 1920.

Notes

References

External links
MaritimeQuest HMS A-13 Pages

 

A-class submarines (1903)
Ships built in Barrow-in-Furness
Royal Navy ship names
1905 ships